Cocculinella osteophila is a species of small, deep water sea snail, a marine gastropod mollusk in the family Cocculinellidae, the limpets.

Distribution
This marine species is endemic to New Zealand.

References

External links
 To World Register of Marine Species

Cocculinellidae
Gastropods described in 1983